USS Hunch (SP-1197) was a United States Navy patrol vessel in commission from 1917 to possibly 1918.

Hunch was built as a private motorboat of the same name in 1907 by the Charles L. Seabury Company and the Gas Engine and Power Company at Morris Heights in the Bronx, New York. In August 1917, the U.S. Navy acquired her from her owner, R. A. Alger of Detroit, Michigan, for use as a section patrol boat during World War I. Ensign P. L. Emerson, USNRF, was assigned as her first commanding officer.

Sources differ on Hunchs career. According to one source, she was returned to Alger in 1917 after little or no Navy service. According to others, she was assigned as USS Hunch (SP-1197) to patrol duties in the 9th, 10th, and 11th Naval Districts - at the time a single administrative entity formed by the almagamation of the 9th Naval District, 10th Naval District, and 11th Naval District - and served as a patrol boat on the Detroit River until returned to Alger in 1918.

Notes

References
 
 SP-1197 Hunch at Department of the Navy Naval History and Heritage Command Online Library of Selected Images: U.S. Navy Ships -- Listed by Hull Number "SP" #s and "ID" #s -- World War I Era Patrol Vessels and other Acquired Ships and Craft numbered from SP-1100 through SP-1199
 NavSource Online: Section Patrol Craft Photo Archive Hunch (SP 1197)

Patrol vessels of the United States Navy
World War I patrol vessels of the United States
Ships built in Morris Heights, Bronx
1907 ships
Great Lakes ships